Kiselyov/Kiseliov/Kiselev (masculine) or Kiselyova/ Kiseleva (feminine) is a Russian surname, derived from the word "kissel". It  may refer to:

Afrikan Kiselyov (1910–1939), Soviet army officer and Hero of the Soviet Union
Aharon Moshe Kiselev (1866-1949), Manchurian rabbi
Alexander Kiselyov, several people
Alexey Kiselyov, several people
Axel Kicillof, Argentine politician
Dmitri Kiselev (1989–), Russian ice dancer
Dmitrii Kiselev, Russian handball player
Dmitry Kiselyov (1954–), Russian television presenter and propagandist
Dmitry Kiselyov (film director)
Gennady Kiselyov (1922–1979), Soviet aircraft pilot and Hero of the Soviet Union
Ivan Alexandrovich Kiselyov (1920–?), Soviet army officer and Hero of the Soviet Union
Ivan Mikhaylovich Kiselyov (1919–1987), Soviet aircraft pilot and Hero of the Soviet Union
 Larisa Kiselyova (born 1970), Russian handball player
Mariya Kiselyova (born 1974), Russian swimmer
Mikhail Kiselyov (born 1986), Russian politician 
Nikolay Kiselyov, several people:
Nikolay Kiselyov (soldier) (1913–1974), Soviet soldier, prisoner of war and partisan commander, Righteous Among the Nations
Nikolay Davydovich Kiselyov (1921–1980), Soviet army officer and Hero of the Soviet Union
Nikolay Kiselyov (athlete) (1939–2005), Soviet Nordic combined skier, silver medalist at the 1964 Winter Olympics
Nikolay Kiselyov (footballer) (born 1946), Soviet international footballer and manager
Nikolay Kiselyov (politician) (born 1950), Russian politician, former Governor of Arkhangelsk Oblast
Nikolai Dmitrievich Kiselev (1802-1869), Russian diplomat and Privy Councilor
Pavel Kiselyov (1788–1872), Russian general and politician
Kiselyov schools, name of rural parish schools in 1842–1867 in Russia; created on initiative of Pavel Kiselyov
Kiselyov reform, a reform of management of state-owned peasants in 1837–1841 in Russia, initiated by Pavel Kiselyov
Șoseaua Kiseleff, a major road in Bucharest, Romania, named after him
Semyon Kiselyov (1906–1985), Soviet commissar and Hero of the Soviet Union
Sergey Kiselyov, several people:
Sergey Kiselyov (historian) (1905–1962), Soviet historian and archeologist
Sergey Semyonovich Kiselyov (1910–1943), Soviet army officer and Hero of the Soviet Union
Sergey Kiselyov (footballer) (born 1976), Russian professional footballer
Tikhon Kiselyov (1917–?), Soviet statesman and party figure
Valery Kiselyov (born 1949), Soviet jazzman
Vasily Kiselyov (1910–1943), Soviet aircraft pilot and Hero of the Soviet Union
Vladimir Alexandrovich Kiselyov (1909–1988), Soviet army officer and Hero of the Soviet Union
Vladimir Kiselyov, Soviet shot put athlete
Yakov Mitrofanovich Kiselyov (1925–?), Soviet soldier and Hero of the Soviet Union
Yakov Semyonovich Kiselyov (1896–?), Soviet lawyer
Yevgeny Kiselyov (born 1956), Russian journalist

References

Russian-language surnames